Jean-Yves Leloup is a French theologian, writer, translator of Greek and Coptic language texts, born in 1950 in Angers. 
He is the author of over ninety books in French, some translated into other languages, including English, German, Spanish and Portuguese.The primary subject of his writings is Christian spirituality. 

He has translated and commented on the apocryphal gospels from the Nag Hammadi library according to Thomas, Philip and Mary (Mary Magdalene), as well as the Gospel according to John and the Apocalypse.
He also explores the meditative and monastic traditions of the Orthodox Church  (Hesychasm) and the teachings of the Fathers of the Church, especially the Desert Fathers, in particular Evagrius Ponticus. He investigates the role of the Feminine in the history of Christianity and considers the dialogue with other spiritual traditions.

Biography 

Jean-Yves Leloup was born in 1950 in Angers. Theologian, novelist and essayist, initiated into Buddhism, trained at Mount Athos, became a Dominican priest, then became Orthodox. A pioneer of transpersonal psychology and founder of the Institute for the Encounter and Study of Civilizations (ecumenism) and of the International College of Therapists (special help for the dyings), he shares some "fragments of his itinerance" in his 1991 autobiography  L'Absurde et la Grâce.

Converted at the age of 20, he discovered Christianity at Mount Athos through Orthodoxy, before entering the Dominican Order. He was trained in theology and ordained a priest at the Dominican convent in Toulouse in June 1978. He further studied psychology in a New York university (Syracuse), spent some time in California and attended Karlfried Graf Dürckheim’s center for initiatory psychotherapy in Germany.

From 1981 onward, he was responsible, with other religious and seculars,  for the International Center, "university of the third millennium", dedicated to the spiritual and the inter-cultural, opened to the welcoming of oriental spiritual traditions  at the former Dominican hostelry of the Sainte-Baume. This represented a challenge for the Catholic Church, while at the same time, Interfaith dialogue was encouraged by the Council and was soon to be given an expression, by Pope John Paul II in Assisi at the first World Day of Prayer for Peace.
Meanwhile, the Dominicans were driven by another project ; That of a return to the roots and a re-capture of the local population. "The Christian qualification of the Center was therefore challenged by the provincial of the Dominican order and the bishop of Toulon, Monseigneur Madec".

Jean-Yves Leloup left the Dominican order in 1986. Historian Olivier Chatelan indicates that the fact that he was married and had a child, was brought to the attention of the Dominican authorities,  he therefore "should no longer  be considered a Dominican". He had to give up the functions he held at the International Center of the Sainte-Baume, while "sympathizers came to his cause".

Having been previously baptized Orthodox in the Monastic Republic of Mount Athos, he joined the French Orthodox Church of the Communion of Western Orthodox Churches ; Where he is known under his religious name of Father Jean Seraphim in the church of Saint-Michel (Var).

Books  in English 
 
 
  
 
   (Foreword by Jacob Needleman)

References

External links 
 Jean-Yves Leloup website
 

1950 births
Living people
20th-century Christian theologians
21st-century Christian theologians
20th-century French male writers
21st-century French male writers
20th-century French non-fiction writers
21st-century French non-fiction writers
French Dominicans
People in interfaith dialogue
People in Christian ecumenism
Philosophers of religion